The Vowels They Orbit is a 5-piece indie pop/rock band from Metro Manila, Philippines. They consist of Nikka Melchor (vocals and guitar), Hannah Dela Cruz (keyboard and backup vocals), Jeremy Sayas (drums and backup vocals), Gene Santiago (guitar), and Patch Javier (bass). The band is represented by Soupstar Entertainment.

History
The band was formed in 2018 and signed under Soupstar. They became openers for the Manila concert of American pop rock band Against the Current on the same year.

In 2019, the band officially signed to Sony Music Philippines. They released their debut single "Selos".

In 2020, the band released their debut 5-track EP Ang Unang Ikot, featuring previous releases like "Selos" and "Kiliti".

Band members
 Nikka Melchor – lead vocals, guitar
 Hannah Dela Cruz – keyboard, backup vocals
 Jeremy Sayas – drums, backup vocals
 Gene Santiago – guitar
 Patch Javier – bass

Discography

Extended plays

Singles

References

Filipino rock music groups
Filipino pop music groups
Musical groups from Metro Manila
Musical groups established in 2018
2018 establishments in the Philippines
Sony Music Philippines artists